The 2009–10 Western Collegiate Hockey Association women's ice hockey season marked the continuation of the annual tradition of competitive ice hockey among Western Collegiate Hockey Association members.

Preseason

 Sept. 24:The Badgers are the preseason pick to win the Western Collegiate Hockey Association women's title, according to a poll of league coaches. Wisconsin went 34-2-5 last season en route to its third NCAA title in four years. The Badgers collected six first-place votes and 48 points in a poll of the eight coaches. Defending WCHA champion Minnesota, placed second with 43 points and two first-place votes. Minnesota Duluth, with 38 points, was selected to finish third. All three of those teams qualified for the NCAA Frozen Four last season.

WCHA Preseason Coaches' Poll

Preseason WCHA awards
Player of the Year voting

Rookie of the Year voting

CIS Exhibition

US Olympic exhibition games
Throughout the season, various NCAA schools will play the United States Olympic Hockey team. 
On September 25, Natalie Darwitz was named the Player of the Game for Team USA.

Box scores
September 25

WCHA All-Star Team
On September 25, a group of WCHA All-Stars will play the US Olympic Team. The head coach of the WCHA All-Stars is Jeff Giesen from St. Cloud State. Assisting him are Maria Lewis from North Dakota and Heather Farrell from Bemidji State. The Athletic Trainer is Stef Arndt from St. Cloud State. The roster is as follows:

Regular season

Standings

November

December

January
January 14: Nina Tikkinen, a junior forward for Minnesota State, has been named to Finland's 2010 Winter Olympic Hockey Team.

February

March

In season honors

Players of the week
Throughout the conference regular season, WCHA officials name a player of the week each Monday.

Defensive players of the week
Throughout the conference regular season, WCHA officials name a Defensive player of the week each Monday.

Rookie of the week
Throughout the conference regular season, WCHA officials name a Freshman player of the week each Monday.

Statistical leaders

Postseason

WCHA tournament

Quarterfinals

February 27: After 3 hours and 47 minutes, Emily West scored at 1:16 of triple overtime to eliminate the MSU-Mankato Mavericks.

February 27: Bemidji State ends its 14 game playoff losing streak in a 2-1 victory over St. Cloud State.

Semifinals

Finals
March 7: The Minnesota Duluth Bulldogs defeated the Minnesota Golden Gophers 3-2 at Ridder Arena in Minneapolis to win the WCHA FINAL FACE-OFF playoff championship. It is the Bulldogs fifth WCHA playoff championship. This was their first postseason victory over the Golden Gophers since 2003. In addition, the Bulldogs lost three previous league playoff games against the Gophers at Ridder Arena.

NCAA tournament

March 8: Two teams from the WCHA will compete for the 10th NCAA Women's Ice Hockey Championship. The University of Minnesota will be the host school for the 2010 Frozen Four, to be held March 19 and 21 at Ridder Arena in Minneapolis. WCHA tournament champion University of Minnesota Duluth, and at-large selection Minnesota will be two of eight competing teams.

Minnesota Duluth (28-8-2) is seeded Number 2 and the Bulldogs will host the New Hampshire Wildcats (19-8-5) on Saturday, March 13 at 2:00 pm central standard time. The Golden Gophers (25-8-5) are the number 3 seed, and will host the Clarkson Golden Eagles (23-11-5), on March 13 at 4:00 pm central standard time. Minnesota Duluth won the Frozen Four for the first three years that the tournament was held (2001, 2002 and 2003). The Golden Gophers proceeded to win the next two Frozen Four tournaments (2004 and 2005). Neither team has won since.

WCHA Awards and honors

WCHA all-academic team

National awards and honors

Patty Kazmaier Award nominees
There are 45 nominees for the Patty Kazmaier Award. Ten of the nominees are from Western Collegiate Hockey Association-member teams.

2010 Olympics

Active players
The following active WCHA players will represent their respective countries in Ice hockey at the 2010 Winter Olympics.

Former players
The following former NCAA players will represent their respective countries in Ice hockey at the 2010 Winter Olympics.

See also
National Collegiate Women's Ice Hockey Championship
2009–10 College Hockey America women's ice hockey season
2009–10 Eastern College Athletic Conference women's ice hockey season
2009–10 NCAA Division I women's ice hockey season
Western Collegiate Hockey Association women's champions

References

Western Collegiate Hockey Association
WCHA